Takvam Chapel is a parish church of the Church of Norway in Bergen Municipality in Vestland county, Norway. It is located in the village of Takvam, in the eastern part of the municipality. It is one of two churches in the Arna parish which is part of the Åsane prosti (deanery) in the Diocese of Bjørgvin. The white, wooden church was built in a rectangular design in 1988 using plans drawn up by the architect Andreas Vold. The church seats about 75 people.

History
In 1912, a graveyard was built in Takvam to serve the local population. In the 1920s, the idea of building a chapel at the graveyear to serve the Takvam area gained momentum. The architect Ivar Namtveit was hired to build the chapel. It was consecrated on 1 April 1926. It was a simple wooden building with a tower over the south entrance. In 1956-1957, a sacristy was built on the east side of the building. By the 1980s, the chapel was in very poor condition with significant rot damage. In 1988, the old chapel was torn down and a new building was constructed in the spring of 1988. The new chapel was consecrated on 5 June 1988 and it now has the status of a church, although the name "chapel" is still used.

Media gallery

See also
List of churches in Bjørgvin

References

Churches in Bergen
Rectangular churches in Norway
Wooden churches in Norway
20th-century Church of Norway church buildings
Churches completed in 1988
1926 establishments in Norway